The 13th Warrior is a 1999 American historical action film based on Michael Crichton's 1976 novel Eaters of the Dead, which is a loose adaptation of the tale of Beowulf combined with Ahmad ibn Fadlan's historical account of the Volga Vikings. It stars Antonio Banderas as ibn Fadlan, as well as Diane Venora and Omar Sharif. It was directed by John McTiernan; Crichton directed some uncredited reshoots. The film was produced by McTiernan, Crichton, and Ned Dowd, with Andrew G. Vajna, James Biggam and Ethan Dubrow as executive producers.

Production and marketing costs reputedly reached $160 million, but it grossed $61 million at the box office worldwide, making it one of the biggest box office bombs in history and the biggest one of 1999, with losses of up to $129 million.

Plot

Ahmad ibn Fadlan is a court poet of the Abbasid Caliph Al-Muqtadir of Baghdad, until his amorous encounter with the wife of an influential noble gets him exiled as an "ambassador" to the Volga Bulgars. Traveling with his father's old friend, Melchisidek, his caravan is saved from Tatar raiders by the appearance of Norsemen. Taking refuge at their settlement on the Volga river, communications are established through Melchisidek and Herger, a Norseman who speaks Greek. From Herger, the two learn that the celebration being held by the Northmen is in fact a funeral for their recently deceased king. Herger also introduces them to one of the king's sons, Buliwyf. Ahmad and Melchisidek then witness a fight in which Buliwyf kills his brother in self defense, which establishes Buliwyf as heir apparent, followed by the Viking funeral of their dead king, cremated together with a young woman who agreed to accompany him to Valhalla.

The next day, a young prince named Wulfgar enters the camp requesting Buliwyf's aid: His father's kingdom in the far north is under attack from an ancient evil so frightening that even the bravest warriors dare not name it. The "angel of death", a völva (wisewoman), determines the mission will be successful if thirteen warriors go to face this danger — but that the thirteenth must not be a Norseman. Ahmad is recruited against his will.

Ahmad is initially treated indifferently by the Norsemen, who mock his small Arabian horse; however, he earns a measure of respect by quickly learning their language through careful observation, a demonstration of horsemanship, and his ability to write. Buliwyf, already a polyglot, asks Ahmad to teach him how to write in Arabic, cementing their goodwill towards one another, and recognizing Ahmad's analytic nature as an asset to their quest.

Reaching King Hrothgar's kingdom, they confirm that their foe is indeed the ancient "Wendol", fiends who come with the mist to kill and take human heads. While the group searches through a raided cabin they find a Venus figurine, said to represent the "Mother of the Wendol". On their first night, Hyglak and Ragnar are killed. In a string of clashes, Buliwyf's band gradually deduce that the Wendol are human cannibals clothed to look like bears, who live like bears, and think of themselves as bears.

Their numbers dwindling, having also lost Skeld, Halga, Roneth, and Rethel, and their position all but indefensible, they consult an ancient völva of the village. She tells them to track the Wendol to their lair and destroy their leaders, the "Mother of the Wendol", and their warlord who wears "the horns of power". Buliwyf and the remaining warriors infiltrate the Wendol cave-complex and kill the Mother, but not before Buliwyf is scratched deeply across the shoulder by her poisoned claw-like fingernail.

Ahmad and the last of the Norse warriors escape the caves (but without the injured Helfdane, who opts to stay behind and fight). They return to the village  to prepare for a last stand. Buliwyf staggers outside before the battle and inspires the warriors with a Viking prayer for the honored dead who will enter Valhalla. Buliwyf succeeds in killing the Wendol warlord, causing their defeat, before succumbing to the poison.

Ahmad witnesses Buliwyf's royal funeral before returning to his homeland, grateful to the Norsemen for helping him to "become a man and a useful servant of God". He is seen at the movie's end writing down the tale of his time with them.

Cast

Production
Originally titled Eaters of the Dead, production began in the summer of 1997, but the film went through several re-edits after test audiences did not react well to the initial cut. Crichton took over as director himself due to the poor test audience reception, causing the release date to be pushed back over a year. The film was re-cut, a new ending added, along with a new score. Graeme Revell was replaced by Jerry Goldsmith as composer. The title was changed to The 13th Warrior.

The budget, which was originally around $85 million, reportedly soared to $100 million before principal photography concluded. With all of the re-shoots and promotional expenses, the total cost of the film was rumored to be as high as $160 million, which given its lackluster box office take (earning US$61.7 million worldwide), made for a loss of $70–130 million.

Reception
The film debuted at No. 2 on its opening weekend behind The Sixth Sense.

The 13th Warrior holds a 33% approval rating on Rotten Tomatoes based on 88 reviews. The consensus is: "Atmospheric, great sets and costumes, but thin plot."

Roger Ebert gave the film one and a half stars out of four, remarking that it "lumber[s] from one expensive set-piece to the next without taking the time to tell a story that might make us care." Conversely, James Berardinelli gave The 13th Warrior three stars out of four, calling it "a solid offering" that "delivers an exhilarating 100 minutes".  Lisa Schwarzbaum of Entertainment Weekly rated it A− and called it "the most unexpectedly audacious, exhilarating, and wildly creative adventure thriller I have seen in ages".

The outcome of the film's production disappointed Omar Sharif so much that he temporarily retired from film acting, not taking a role in another major film until 2003's Monsieur Ibrahim:
"After my small role in The 13th Warrior, I said to myself, 'Let us stop this nonsense, these meal tickets that we do because it pays well.' I thought, 'Unless I find a stupendous film that I love and that makes me want to leave home to do, I will stop.' Bad pictures are very humiliating, I was really sick. It is terrifying to have to do the dialogue from bad scripts, to face a director who does not know what he is doing, in a film so bad that it is not even worth exploring."

Some retrospective reviewers have since reassessed the film, particularly after Vikings became popular in fiction.

Soundtrack

The original soundtrack was composed by Graeme Revell and featured the Dead Can Dance singer Lisa Gerrard. The score was rejected by Michael Crichton and was replaced by one composed by Crichton's usual collaborator, Jerry Goldsmith.

See also
 List of historical drama films
 List of box office bombs

References

External links

 
 
 
 
 Interview

1999 films
1990s action adventure films
1990s fantasy adventure films
American action adventure films
American fantasy adventure films
1990s English-language films
Films based on Beowulf
Films based on works by Michael Crichton
Films based on Norse mythology
Films based on European myths and legends
Films set in the Viking Age
Films set in the 10th century
Films set in Baghdad
Films set in Russia
Films shot in British Columbia
Touchstone Pictures films
Films scored by Jerry Goldsmith
Films directed by John McTiernan
Films about cannibalism
Films produced by John McTiernan
Films with screenplays by William Wisher Jr.
1990s American films